Franz Maresch (born 28 June 1972) is an Austrian football manager and former player. He is currently contracted to Sportklub Rapid Vienna.

External links
 

1972 births
Living people
Austrian footballers
Austrian football managers
Floridsdorfer AC managers
FK Austria Wien players
First Vienna FC players
SC Untersiebenbrunn players
2. Liga (Austria) players
Austrian Football Bundesliga players
Association football forwards
Footballers from Vienna
Wiener Sport-Club managers